Dujeong Station is a railway station located in northern Cheonan.  The station opened on the Gyeongbu Line – the line from Seoul to Busan – on June 15, 1979, and was put under the control of Cheonan Station on July 1, 1985. It has also been served by Seoul Subway Line 1 since January 20, 2005. The station is close to Gongju University, the Cheonan campuses of Sangmyung University, Dankook University, Hoseo University and Baekseok University. It is also in proximity of Cheonan Bus Terminal, Cheonan Industrial Complex, Cheonan Sindae Elementary School, Bugil Academy and 
Bugil Girls' High School. Technically, the station is also on the Cheonan Connection Line, though this has only two stops: Cheonan and Dujeong. Very close to the station you can find a large movie theater (CINUS) with restaurants and snack shops.

References

External links
 Station information from Korail

Seoul Metropolitan Subway stations
Railway stations opened in 1979
Metro stations in Cheonan